The Asian Woolly Hackberry Aphid, (Shivaphis celti), also known as Shivaphis (Shivaphis) celti, is an aphid in the superfamily Aphidoidea in the order Hemiptera. It is a tree bug and sucks sap from plants.

References 

 http://animaldiversity.org/accounts/Shivaphis_celti/classification/
 http://entnemdept.ifas.ufl.edu/creatures/trees/asian_hackberry.htm
 http://www.nbair.res.in/Aphids/Shivaphis_celti.php
 http://www.ipm.ucdavis.edu/PMG/PESTNOTES/pn74111.html
 http://bugguide.net/node/view/18904/bgimage
 http://cisr.ucr.edu/hackberry.html
 http://aphid.speciesfile.org/Common/basic/Taxa.aspx?TaxonNameID=1160280

Panaphidini
Agricultural pest insects
Hemiptera of Asia